The unification of Romania of Romanian unification may refer to the following events:

 The personal union of the principalities of Moldavia, Transylvania and Wallachia under the rule of Michael the Brave of 1600
 The unification of Moldavia and Wallachia following the election of Alexandru Ioan Cuza on both principalities on 1859
 The Great Union, a name given to the series of unifications that Romania made with ethnically Romanian-populated regions (Bessarabia, Bukovina and Transylvania) in 1918 that gave rise to Greater Romania
 The unification of Moldova and Romania, a current proposed unification between Moldova and Romania